The Clark–Eames House is a historic house located at 230 Middlefield Road in Washington, Massachusetts.  Probably built around 1790, it is one of the town's few surviving 18th-century houses.  It was listed on the National Register of Historic Places in 1986.

Description and history 
The Clark–Eames House is located in a rural setting in the southeastern corner of Washington; the closest village is that of Becket to the southwest.  It is located on the southeast side of Middlefield Road, roughly opposite its junction with Johnson Hill Road.  It is a -story wood-frame structure, with a side-gable roof, central chimney, and clapboarded exterior.  Its five-bay front facade has simple Federal period styling, with simple moulded surrounds around the windows, and a center entrance with flanking pilasters and a corniced entablature.  In the late 19th century, the entrance was sheltered by a gable-roof hood with Victorian styling, but that has since been removed.

It is one of only a handful houses constructed in the area during the 18th century, with a construction date sometime between 1782 and 1797.  Its presence in a remote corner of the town exemplifies the town's dispersed form of settlement.  The house was the seat of a  farm for most of the 19th century.  It now serves as a vacation residence, show another trend on how the town's economy has changed in the 20th century.

See also
National Register of Historic Places listings in Berkshire County, Massachusetts

References

Houses in Berkshire County, Massachusetts
Houses on the National Register of Historic Places in Berkshire County, Massachusetts
Federal architecture in Massachusetts
Washington, Massachusetts